Eva Nogales (born in Colmenar Viejo, Spain) is a Spanish-American biophysicist at the Lawrence Berkeley National Laboratory and a professor at the University of California, Berkeley, where she served as head of the Division of Biochemistry, Biophysics and Structural Biology of the Department of Molecular and Cell Biology (2015–2020). She is a Howard Hughes Medical Institute investigator.

Nogales is a pioneer in using electron microscopy for the structural and functional characterization of macromolecular complexes. She used electron crystallography to obtain the first structure of tubulin and identify the binding site of the important anti-cancer drug taxol. She is a leader in combining cryo-EM, computational image analysis and biochemical assays to gain insights into function and regulation of biological complexes and molecular machines. Her work has uncovered aspects of cellular function that are relevant to the treatment of cancer and other diseases.

Early life and education
Eva Nogales obtained her BS degree in physics from the Autonomous University of Madrid in 1988. She later earned her PhD from the University of Keele in 1992 while working at the Synchrotron Radiation Source under the supervision of Joan Bordas.

Career
During her post-doctoral work in the laboratory of Ken Downing at  the Lawrence Berkeley National Laboratory, Eva Nogales was the first to determine the atomic structure of tubulin and the location of the taxol-binding site by electron crystallography.  She became an assistant professor in the Department of Molecular and Cell Biology at the University of California, Berkeley in 1998. In 2000 she became an investigator in the Howard Hughes Medical Institute. As cryo-EM techniques became more powerful, she became a leader in applying cryo-EM to the study of microtubule structure and function and other large macromolecular assemblies such as eukaryotic transcription and translation initiation complexes, the polycomb complex PRC2, and telomerase.

Selected publications

Awards
 2000: investigator, Howard Hughes Medical Institute
2005: Early Career Life Scientist Award, American Society for Cell Biology
 2006: Chabot Science Award for Excellence
2015: Dorothy Crowfoot Hodgkin Award, Protein Society
 2015: Elected as a member of the US National Academy of Sciences
2016: Elected to the American Academy of Arts and Sciences
2018: Women in Cell Biology Award (Senior), American Society for Cell Biology
 2019: Grimwade Medal for Biochemistry.
 2021: AAAS Fellows Award.

Personal life
Nogales is married to Howard Padmore and they have two children.

References

External links 
 Molecules in motion
 Nogales lab
 

Howard Hughes Medical Investigators
Living people
Molecular biologists
Spanish biophysicists
Women biophysicists
Biophysicists
Spanish emigrants to the United States
University of California, Berkeley faculty
American women biologists
Year of birth missing (living people)
21st-century American women scientists
Members of the United States National Academy of Sciences
Alumni of Keele University
Autonomous University of Madrid alumni